Yare Nee Abhimani is a 2000 Indian Kannada-language film,  directed by  D. Rajendra Babu and produced by Lakshman Pramod Kumar. The film stars Shiva Rajkumar, Ramya Krishna and Sangita. The film is a remake of the 1993 Hindi film Aaina.

Cast
 Shiva Rajkumar as Adithya
 Ramya Krishna as Prajna
 Sangita as Utthara
 Srinath as Prajna & Utthara's Father
 Dwarakish as Gundlupete Gundanna
 Doddanna as Photographer
 Mandeep Roy
 Vijayasarathi
 Rekha Das
 M. S. Karanth

Soundtrack
All the songs are composed and written by Hamsalekha.

References

2000 films
2000s Kannada-language films
Kannada remakes of Hindi films
Films scored by Hamsalekha
Indian drama films
Films directed by D. Rajendra Babu
2000 drama films